Strange Weather is a 1987 studio album by British singer Marianne Faithfull.

This album is the first complete studio work recorded by Marianne Faithfull after recovering from a 17-year addiction to heroin in 1986.  The album's three predecessors on Island Records were all recorded while Faithfull confronted various personal struggles and contained a majority of lyrics and some music penned by Faithfull herself.   In contrast, Strange Weather is a striking mix of rock, blues and dark cabaret, and though none of the songs were written by Faithfull all are tied together by the spare and nuanced production of Hal Willner along with a notable group of contributing musicians.  The title track has since become a Faithfull concert staple and has appeared live in three additional recordings.

Overview 
In 1985 Faithfull contributed a single track, "Ballad of the Soldier's Wife", to Lost In The Stars, a tribute to the music of Kurt Weill by various contemporary artists. In response to the success of the project and to favourable reviews for Faithfull's contribution, producer Hal Willner suggested the potential of an expanded project of classic compositions, but, according to Willner in Strange Weather'''s liner notes, he believed it was "one of those projects which usually never comes to fruition."

Just prior to her recovery, Faithfull began work on a new album of rock songs, but Island Records scrapped the project  Instead, Willner re-entered the picture and the concept of the album of classic standards was expanded to include not only material contemporary to Weill's Weimar Republic era but a more recent song by Bob Dylan, two early folk-era spirituals, traditional piano blues with accompaniment by Dr. John (credited as Mac Rebennack), and all new material was written specifically for the project. The album’s title track was written by Tom Waits and Kathleen Brennan, and "Hello Stranger" was written by Rebennack and Doc Pomus. Faithfull also re-recorded her 1964 hit, "As Tears Go By," in a markedly different arrangement using a slower time signature, and sung a full octave lower than the original.Strange Weather'' failed to make it to the US Album charts (it did chart in both the UK and Australia), and never charted its only single "As Tears Go By".

Track listing
 "Stranger Intro" (Bill Frisell) – 0:31
 "Boulevard of Broken Dreams" (Al Dubin, Harry Warren) – 3:04
 "I Ain't Goin' Down to the Well No More" (Huddie Ledbetter, Alan Lomax, John Lomax) – 1:07
 "Yesterdays" (Otto Harbach, Jerome Kern) – 5:20
 "Sign of Judgement" (Kid Prince Moore) – 2:54 
 "Strange Weather" (Tom Waits, Kathleen Brennan) – 4:05
 "Love, Life and Money" (Julius Dixon, Henry Glover) – 4:40
 "I'll Keep It With Mine" (Bob Dylan) – 4:13
 "Hello Stranger" (Doc Pomus, Dr. John credited as Mac Rebennack) – 2:30
 "Penthouse Serenade" (Will Jason, Val Burton) – 2:34
 "As Tears Go By" (Mick Jagger, Keith Richards, Andrew Loog Oldham) – 3:42
 "A Stranger On Earth" (Sid Feller, Rick Ward) – 3:56

Personnel
 Marianne Faithfull - vocals
 Bill Frisell - guitars
 Robert Quine - guitar (6, 7)
 Fernando Saunders - bass (2, 4, 6–11)
 Michael Levine - violin
 Sharon Freeman - piano (2, 8)
 Dr. John - (credited as Mac Rebennack) - piano
 Steve Slagle - alto saxophone
 Chris Hunter - alto saxophone, flute
 Lew Soloff - trumpet
 Garth Hudson - accordion
 J.T. Lewis - drums, horn arrangements
 William Schimmel - accordion
 Michael Gibbs - string arrangements

Technical personnel 
 Hal Willner - producer
 Joe Ferla - recording, mixing
 Tony Wright - cover and sleeve photography

Charts

References

1987 albums
Marianne Faithfull albums
Albums produced by Hal Willner
Island Records albums